Club de Fútbol Torreón was a former Mexican football team that played in the top league and in the second division. It was based in the city of Torreón, Coahuila.

History

The club was founded in 1960. It was formed from the old club El Cataluña who played in the Segunda División. They played with that name for 3 years then changed its name to Torreón.

The club was promoted in the 1968–1969 coached by the Peruvian Grimaldo González .

Honors

 Runner Up Copa Mexico (1): 1969–1970
 Segunda División Profesional (1): 1968–1969
 Copa Mexico from the Segunda División Profesional (1): 1968–1969
 Runner Up Copa Mexico de la Segunda División Profesional (1): 1953–1954

See also
Club de Fútbol Laguna
Santos Laguna

External links
Equipos de la Laguna

Defunct football clubs in Coahuila
Defunct football clubs in Mexico
Association football clubs established in 1960
1960 establishments in Mexico